Archie Richard "Happy" or "Hap" McKain (May 12, 1911 – May 21, 1985) was a left-handed Major League Baseball pitcher with the Boston Red Sox, Detroit Tigers and the St. Louis Browns between 1937 and 1943.

McKain was born in Delphos, Kansas, in 1911.

He began playing professional baseball in 1930 with the Pueblo Braves in the Western League. In his second season, he compiled an 18-12 record for the Braves with a 3.86 earned run average (ERA). He advanced to AA baseball with the Louisville Colonels of the American Association. His performance dropped in 1931 as he compiled a 9-19 record. He remained with Louisville until 1935 when he joined the Minneapolis Millers.

McKain made his major league debut with the Red Sox in 1937. In two seasons with Boston, he compiled a 13-12 record and a 4.60 ERA. 

McKain was traded to the Tigers with Pinky Higgins on December 15, 1938, in exchange for Elden Auker, Chet Morgan and Jake Wade. He spent two-and-a-half seasons with the Tigers, compiling a 12-7 record and 3.74 ERA. He had his best season in 1940, compiling a 5–0 record with a 2.82 ERA (adjusted ERA+ of 168) as the Tigers won the American League pennant. He appeared in Game 4 of the 1940 World Series.

In August, 1941, the Tigers sold McKain to the St. Louis Browns. He appeared in 18 games for the Browns in 1941 and 1943. When the Browns traded him to Brooklyn in July 1943, he retired from baseball. 

After his baseball career, McKain lived in Minneapolis, Kansas, where he worked as a farmer and carpenter. He died in 1985 at Asbury Hospital at age 74 in Salina, Kansas.

References

External links
 SABR biography
 

Baseball players from Kansas
Boston Red Sox players
Detroit Tigers players
Major League Baseball pitchers
Pueblo Braves players
Louisville Colonels (minor league) players
Minneapolis Millers (baseball) players
Toledo Mud Hens players
St. Louis Browns players
1911 births
1985 deaths